Time Vaults is an album by Van der Graaf Generator. It was originally released in 1982 on cassette only, almost four years after the break-up of Van der Graaf Generator in 1978. Later it was released as a vinyl LP, and in 1992 it was released on CD.

The album contains outtakes and rehearsals from the period 1972-1975, when the band was on hiatus. The recordings "are not studio-quality recordings", according to Peter Hammill. It contains previously unreleased songs taken from rehearsals by the reformed band in 1975, plus a few live numbers from mid-1972, originally intended for a projected album in late 1972.

"Coil Night" features Peter Hammill on bass guitar and David Jackson on piano. The title track "Time Vaults" is a collage consisting of several unreleased pieces mixed with studio chatter. A different version of "Black Room" appeared on Peter Hammill's solo album Chameleon in the Shadow of the Night. "Faint and Forsaken" is a combination of the instrumental middle passages of "Forsaken Gardens" and "Faint-Heart and the Sermon", different versions of which appeared on Peter Hammill's solo albums The Silent Corner and the Empty Stage and In Camera respectively.

Track listing
 "The Liquidator" (Hammill) – 5:24
 "Rift Valley" (Hammill, Jackson, Evans) – 4:40
 "Tarzan" (Hammill, Jackson, Evans, Banton) – 2:09
 "Coil Night" (Jackson) – 4:12
 "Time Vaults" (uncredited) – 3:33
 "Drift (I Hope It Won't)" (Banton) – 2:40
 "Roncevaux" (Hammill) – 6:55
 "It All Went Red" (on some pressings incorrectly called "It All Went Up") (Hammill) – 4:07
 "Faint and Forsaken" (Hammill) – 2:45
 "Black Room" (Hammill) – 8:52

Personnel 
Van der Graaf Generator
Peter Hammill – vocals, guitar, piano, bass
David Jackson – saxophone, piano
Hugh Banton – organ, bass
Guy Evans – drums

References

Van der Graaf Generator albums
1982 albums
Albums recorded at Rockfield Studios